Fred Guttenberg (born December 24, 1965) is an American activist against gun violence. His 14-year-old daughter Jaime Guttenberg was murdered in the Stoneman Douglas High School shooting on February 14, 2018. His son, Jesse, also a student at the school, ran from the shooting to meet him at a nearby store. He learned about his daughter's death from a friend who is a Coral Springs SWAT officer. Jessica McBride, for the website Heavy, described him as "one of the strongest voices for changes to gun laws in the wake of the mass shooting".

Activism

The day after the shooting, Guttenberg spoke out for gun control, stating "Don't tell me there's no such thing as gun violence. It happened in Parkland". Before the nationally televised CNN town hall he criticized the President for not saying guns are a problem in a White House listening session, saying "My daughter was hunted last week" and "I am enraged". During the CNN town hall he confronted Florida Senator Marco Rubio for his position on guns.

According to a report in The Guardian, Guttenberg's priorities include raising the minimum age to buy guns, adding a waiting period before gun sales, having a no-loopholes policy for a mandatory background check of the gun buyer, and banning high-capacity ammunition magazines and bump stocks. While he would prefer that assault-style weapons were banned entirely, he believes that given the current political reality, that such a ban would be unlikely to ever happen, and accordingly he is advocating for measures to reduce gun violence which have a realistic chance of passage.

He told the Tampa Bay Times in March 2018 he has dedicated the rest of his life to fighting for gun safety.

NRA 
He is a staunch critic of the National Rifle Association as well as its spokesperson Dana Loesch, and he criticized the NRA advertisement entitled Time Is Running Out, saying if a terrorist organization released a similar video, the terror threat level would raise. He told lawmakers that "All our legislators who stand with the NRA, they're standing with a terrorist group." He called on President Donald Trump to address threats made against survivors and their families and demand such behavior stop.

Guttenberg noted that guns were prohibited by the Secret Service at the NRA convention in Dallas when vice president Mike Pence is scheduled to speak, and criticized the decision as hypocritical. Guttenberg said:

Political 

In early March 2018 he traveled to Washington to speak at a US Senate hearing about taking steps to prevent further violence. While in the Washington area he spoke at a town hall in Alexandria, Virginia. Guttenberg's advocacy has been characterized by his refusal to sit down, with Democratic Florida Senator Bill Nelson explaining that Guttenberg "cannot talk about this sitting down."

A candidate for Florida's 22nd congressional district, Javier Manjarres, wrote on social media in July 2018, "C'mon Fred...stop exploiting her death in the name of some political agenda...your daughter was shot by some lunatic who had an AR-15, not by the gun itself. #Fixit #VoteJavi". Guttenberg responded that he would do everything possible to make sure that Manjarres would not "sniff the halls of Congress", and that "If you call honesty around gun safety exploitation, then you clearly have a political agenda."

On September 4, 2018, at a hearing for the Brett Kavanaugh Supreme Court nomination, Guttenberg introduced himself to Kavanaugh, who looked at him, but turned away without shaking his hand. The encounter was the basis of a written question from the senators, to which Kavanaugh wrote that he did not recognize Guttenberg after having had a "chaotic morning".
Guttenberg criticized Kavanaugh's response, calling it "less than genuine".

In September 2019, Guttenberg met with Ted Cruz and Alyssa Milano to discuss gun violence. He said this was "a really important day." On February 4, 2020, Guttenberg was invited to attend President Trump's State of the Union address. During the speech, Guttenberg attempted to shout over the President, and was asked to leave. The following day he apologized for the outburst, saying he let his emotions get the best of him.

After Robb Elementary School shooting in 2022, Guttenberg called for politicians to enact stricter gun control, and expressed support for the families of the victims.

Legal 
In May 2018, Guttenberg and another parent whose child was killed in the massacre filed lawsuits against American Outdoor Brands, a company that makes the AR-15 rifle, and Sunrise Tactical Supply, a store that sold the weapon to the shooter, as being "complicit in the attack" that resulted in 17 deaths. The lawsuit is the first step in an effort to challenge a 2001 Florida law that protects gun makers and gun sellers from such lawsuits.

Personal life
Guttenberg is a real estate agent and auto broker in Parkland, Florida. Guttenberg grew up in a Conservative Jewish home and is a Reform Jew as an adult. He struggled with his faith after his daughter's death; he ceased attending synagogue but remained on good terms with his rabbi.

References

External links

 Official website
 
 Fred Guttenberg on PBS NewsHour

1965 births
Living people
American gun control activists
20th-century American Jews
American real estate brokers
Jewish American activists
People from Parkland, Florida
Stoneman Douglas High School shooting activists
People from East Northport, New York
Gun politics in the United States
21st-century American Jews
Activists from New York (state)